The selamlik, selamlek or sélamlique was the portion of an Ottoman palace or house reserved for men; as contrasted with the seraglio, which is reserved for women and forbidden to men. 

Selamlik was also a portion of the household reserved for the guests (from the root word selam, "greeting"), similar to the andronites (courtyard of men) in Ancient Greece, where guests would be welcomed by the males of the household. The harem is the portion for the family.

See also
Haremlik
Odalisque

Sources and references
 Dictionary.com - Selamlik entry

Ottoman culture
Ottoman architecture
Turkish words and phrases